In cricket, a captain is a player who leads the team and has additional roles and responsibilities. The Big Bash League (BBL) is a professional Twenty20 cricket league in Australia, which has been held annually since its first season in 2011–12. In the nine seasons played, 49 players have captained their team in at least one match.

Aaron Finch, from the Melbourne Renegades, has played the most number of matches as a captain, leading the team in 59 matches with a win–loss percentage of 47.45. Among the captains who have captained more than ten matches, the Sydney Sixers' Steve Smith has the best win–loss percentage: 77.27. Chris Rogers has captained the most number of matches without registering a win; he led the Sydney Thunder in six matches and all of them were lost. There have been seven non-Australian captains in the BBL: two from New Zealand, South Africa, and the West Indies each, and one from the Netherlands. Eight players have captained more than one team in their BBL career.

The list includes those players who have captained their team in at least one BBL match. The list is initially organised by the number of matches as a captain and if the numbers are tied, the list is sorted by last name.

Key

List of BBL captains

Notes

References

Captains
Big Bash League